Canal Room was a music venue located at 285 West Broadway between Canal Street and Lispenard Street in the Tribeca neighborhood of Manhattan, New York City. The space was formerly known as "Shine".  It underwent a $1 million renovation in 2003 by owner Marcus Linial, a former J Records "star".  The venue specialized in cover and tribute bands and accommodated approximately 450 people.

References
Notes

External links
Canal Room website

Music venues completed in 2003
Drinking establishments in Manhattan
Music venues in Manhattan
Nightlife in New York City
Tribeca